To the Arctic 3D is a 2012 American IMAX 3D documentary film directed by Greg MacGillivray. It was narrated by Meryl Streep.

Reception
, the film holds a 64% approval rating on review aggregator website Rotten Tomatoes, based on 28 reviews with an average rating of 6.5/10.

References

External links
 

2012 films
Documentary films about nature
American independent films
IMAX short films
2012 3D films
2012 short documentary films
2012 independent films
American short documentary films
American 3D films
3D short films
Films about polar bears
Documentary films about the Arctic
Short films directed by Greg MacGillivray
IMAX documentary films
3D documentary films
MacGillivray Freeman Films films
2010s English-language films
2010s American films